Reguenga is a rural parish located 6 km south of the city of Santo Tirso. The population in 2011 was 1,596, in an area of 5.00 km².

References

Freguesias of Santo Tirso